Todorovski is a Macedonian surname and is the equivalent of the Bulgarian Todorov and the Serbian Todorović. Notable people with this surname include:

Aleksandar Todorovski (b. 1984) – Macedonian footballer
Goce Todorovski (b. 1982) – Macedonian footballer
Goce Todorovski (b. 1951) – Macedonian actor
Blaže Todorovski (b. 1985) – Macedonian footballer
Hristijan Todorovski Karposh (1921–1944) – Macedonian communist revolutionary

See also
Todorović – Serbian form
Todorov – Bulgarian form
Theodore – root of surname

Surnames
Macedonian-language surnames